CPCC can refer to:
Civilian Planning and Conduct Capability, the headquarters of European Union civilian missions
Central Piedmont Community College
 The Canadian Playing Card Company